Vilas County is a county in the state of Wisconsin, United States. As of the 2020 census, the population was 23,047. Its county seat is Eagle River. The county partly overlaps the reservation of the Lac du Flambeau Band of Lake Superior Chippewa.

History

Native Americans
Native Americans have lived in what is now Vilas County for thousands of years. The county contains archaeological sites dating to the prehistoric Woodland period. In the eighteenth century, the area was disputed by the Dakota and Ojibwe people. According to oral histories, the conflict culminated in Ojibwe victory in a battle on Strawberry Island in Flambeau Lake around 1745. Ojibwe people have continued to live in the area ever since, securing the Lac du Flambeau Indian Reservation in the 1854 Treaty of La Pointe.

Settlement
The first recorded white settler was a man named Ashman who established a trading post in Lac du Flambeau in 1818.

In the 1850s migrants from New England, primarily from Vermont and Connecticut, constructed wagon roads and trails through Vilas County including the Ontonagan Mail Trail and a military road from Fort Howard to Fort Wilkins in Copper Harbor, Michigan.

Vilas County was set off from Oneida County on April 12, 1893, and named for William Freeman Vilas. Originally from Vermont, Vilas represented Wisconsin in the United States Senate from 1891 to 1897.

Logging era
Logging began in the late 1850s. Loggers came from Cortland County, New York, Carroll County, New Hampshire, Orange County, Vermont and Down East Maine in what is now Washington County, Maine and Hancock County, Maine. Many dams were built throughout the county to assist loggers as they sent their timber downstream to the lumber and paper mills in the Wisconsin River valley.  After the county was founded in 1893 and logging ceased to be the primary industry in the area, migrants seeking other forms of employment settled in the county. These later immigrants primarily came from Germany, Ireland and Poland though some came from other parts of the United States as well.

Geography

There are 1,318 lakes in the county. Much of Vilas County is covered by the Chequamegon-Nicolet National Forest and the Northern Highland-American Legion State Forest as well as extensive county forest lands. Vilas County waters drain to Lake Superior, Lake Michigan, and the Mississippi River. The Wisconsin, Flambeau, and Presque Isle Rivers all find their headwaters in Vilas County.

Adjacent counties
 Forest County - southeast
 Iron County - west
 Oneida County - south
 Price County - southwest
 Gogebic County, Michigan - north
 Iron County, Michigan - northeast

Major highways
  U.S. Highway 45
  U.S. Highway 51
  Highway 17 (Wisconsin)
  Highway 32 (Wisconsin)
  Highway 47 (Wisconsin)
  Highway 70 (Wisconsin)
  Highway 155 (Wisconsin)

Buses
List of intercity bus stops in Wisconsin

Airports
 KARV - Lakeland Airport / Noble F. Lee Memorial Field
 KEGV - Eagle River Union Airport
 KLNL - Kings Land O' Lakes Airport
 D25  - Manitowish Waters Airport

National protected areas
 Chequamegon National Forest (part)
 Nicolet National Forest (part)
Although these two forests have been administratively combined into the Chequamegon-Nicolet National Forest, it is important to note that the county contains portions of both original forests.

Demographics

2020 census
As of the census of 2020, the population was 23,047. The racial makeup of the county was 85.5% White, 9.8% Native American, 0.3% Black or African American, 0.3% Asian, 0.5% from other races, and 3.7% from two or more races. Ethnically, the population was 2.0% Hispanic or Latino of any race.

2000 census

As of the census of 2000, there were 21,033 people, 9,066 households, and 6,300 families residing in the county. The population density was 24 people per square mile (9/km2). There were 22,397 housing units at an average density of 26 per square mile (10/km2). The racial makeup of the county was 89.69% White, 0.20% Black or African American, 9.08% Native American, 0.18% Asian, 0.01% Pacific Islander, 0.19% from other races, and 0.65% from two or more races.  0.86% of the population were Hispanic or Latino of any race. 37.8% were of German, 7.9% Polish, 6.6% Irish and 5.3% English ancestry. 95.9% spoke English, 1.3% Spanish and 1.2% German as their first language.

There were 9,066 households, out of which 23.40% had children under the age of 18 living with them, 58.40% were married couples living together, 7.50% had a female householder with no husband present, and 30.50% were non-families. 26.00% of all households were made up of individuals, and 12.60% had someone living alone who was 65 years of age or older. The average household size was 2.29 and the average family size was 2.73.

In the county, the population was spread out, with 20.70% under the age of 18, 5.00% from 18 to 24, 23.10% from 25 to 44, 28.50% from 45 to 64, and 22.80% who were 65 years of age or older. The median age was 46 years. For every 100 females there were 99.10 males. For every 100 females age 18 and over, there were 95.80 males.

In 2017, there were 186 births, giving a general fertility rate of 74.9 births per 1000 women aged 15–44, the 7th highest rate out of all 72 Wisconsin counties. Additionally, there were twelve reported induced abortions performed on women of Vilas County residence in 2017.

Economy
The economy in Vilas County is based on tourism centered on its high concentration of lakes and forests. Hunting and sport fishing are the backbones of the fall economy, and ice fishing and especially snowmobiling makes up the bulk of the economy in the wintertime. Logging, forestry, construction and government also account for important parts of the local economy.

Municipalities
The municipalities with their population within Vilas County and their total population as of the 2010 Census, are:

City
 Eagle River – 1,398 (county seat)

Towns

 Arbor Vitae – 3,316
 Boulder Junction – 933
 Cloverland – 1,029
 Conover – 1,235
 Lac du Flambeau – 3,441
 Land O' Lakes – 861
 Lincoln – 2,423
 Manitowish Waters – 566
 Phelps – 1,200
 Plum Lake – 491
 Presque Isle – 618
 St. Germain – 2,085
 Washington – 1,451
 Winchester – 383

Census-designated places

 Boulder Junction – 183
 Lac du Flambeau – 1,969
 Sayner – 207

Other unincorporated communities

 Arbor Vitae
 Conover
 Katinka Village
 Land O' Lakes
 Manitowish Waters
 Marlands
 Phelps
 Presque Isle
 St. Germain
 Star Lake
 Winchester

Notable people
 Herman Finger was the Treasurer of Vilas County in the 1890s while also co-owning and operating Gerry Lumber Company in the county
 Screenwriter Winifred Dunn was born in Vilas County.

Politics

Images

See also
 National Register of Historic Places listings in Vilas County, Wisconsin

References

Further reading
 Commemorative Biographical Record of the Upper Wisconsin Counties of Waupaca, Portage, Wood, Marathon, Lincoln, Oneida, Vilas, Langlade and Shawano. Chicago: J. H. Beers, 1895.
 Jones, George O.; McVean, Norman S. (comp.). History of Lincoln, Oneida and Vilas Counties, Wisconsin. Minneapolis: H. C. Cooper, Jr., 1924.

External links
 Vilas County government website
 Vilas County Chamber of Commerce
 Vilas County map from the Wisconsin Department of Transportation

 
Populated places established in 1893
1893 establishments in Wisconsin